Mahlet Afework is an Ethiopian  fashion designer and entrepreneur.

Early years and education 
Afework was supposed to study nursing for two years. But in the middle of her studies, she quit to study Fashion.

Career 
zAfework began her career at age 16 as a model and musician. While in grade 9, she took interest in rap music and released a single titled Shalom Africa. Aside getting a deal from Yosef Gebre Jossy, a famous recording artiste in Addis Ababa, to record an album, she was also given the opportunity to design clothes for his music video, Jossy In Z House. Through Google and youtube videos, she learned Fashion. In 2011, she founded Mafi Mafi, an Ethiopian fashion label. She uses hand-woven fabrics made by women from Ethiopia's rural areas to create clothing and accessories. She has collaborated with cult UK designer Markus Lupfer and has exhibited at London college of fashion, European Fashion Day in Addis and Africa Fashion Week New York.

In 2014, she gave a TED Talk about Ancient tradition and modern fashion.

Awards 

 2010 - She won the Designer of the Year award from Alliance Ethio-Française at European Fashion Day in Addis
 2012 - She won the Origin Africa‘s design award at African Fashion Week New York 2012
 2017 - She won the Creative Futures award

Personal life 
She is married.

References

Living people
Ethiopian fashion
Ethiopian fashion designers
Ethiopian businesspeople
Year of birth missing (living people)